Big Brother is a Dutch reality competition television franchise created by John de Mol Jr., first broadcast in the Netherlands in 1999, and subsequently syndicated internationally. The show features contestants called "housemates" or "HouseGuests" who live together in a specially constructed house that is isolated from the outside world. The name is inspired by Big Brother from George Orwell's novel Nineteen Eighty-Four, and the housemates are continuously monitored during their stay in the house by live television cameras as well as personal audio microphones. Throughout the course of the competition, they are voted out (usually on a weekly basis) until only one remains and wins the cash prize.

, there have been 504 seasons of Big Brother in over 62 franchise countries and regions. English-language editions of the program are often referred to by its initials "BB". The title of many Spanish-language editions of the program is translated as Gran Hermano (GH).

Premise 

At regular intervals, the housemates privately nominate a number of their fellow housemates whom they wish to be evicted from the house. The housemates with the most nominations are then announced, and viewers are given the opportunity to vote via telephone for the nominee they wish to be evicted or saved from eviction. The last person remaining is declared the winner.

Some more recent editions have since included additional methods of voting, such as voting through social media and smartphone applications. Occasionally, non-standard votes occur, where two houseguests are evicted at once or no one is voted out. In the earlier series of Big Brother, there were 10 contestants with evictions every two weeks. However, the UK version introduced a larger number of contestants with weekly evictions. Most versions of Big Brother follow the weekly eviction format, broadcast over approximately three months for 16 contestants.

The contestants are required to do housework and are assigned tasks by the producers of the show (who communicate with the housemates via the omnipresent authority figure known to them only as "Big Brother"). The tasks are designed to test their teamwork abilities and community spirit. In some countries, the housemates' shopping budget or weekly allowance (to buy food and other essentials) depends on the outcome of assigned tasks.

History

Name 
The term Big Brother originates from George Orwell's novel Nineteen Eighty-Four, with its theme of continuous oppressive surveillance. The program also relies on other techniques, such as a stripped back-to-basic environment, evictions, weekly tasks and competitions set by Big Brother, and the "Diary Room" (or "Confession Room") where housemates convey their private thoughts to the camera and reveal their nominees for eviction.

Creation 
The first version of Big Brother was broadcast in 1999 on Veronica in the Netherlands. In the first season of Big Brother, the house was very basic. Although essential amenities such as running water, furniture, and a limited ration of food were provided, luxury items were often forbidden. This added a survivalist element to the show, increasing the potential for social tension. Nearly all later series provide a modern house for the contest with a Jacuzzi, sauna, VIP suite, loft, and other luxuries.

International expansion 
The format has become an international TV franchise. While each country or region has its own variation, the common theme is that the contestants are confined to the house and have their every action recorded by cameras and microphones and that no contact with the outside world is permitted.

Most international versions of the show remain quite similar to each other: their main format remains true to the original fly on the wall observational style with the emphasis on human relationships, to the extent that contestants usually are forbidden from discussing nominations or voting strategy. In 2001, the American version adopted a different format since the second season, where the contestants are encouraged to strategize to advance in the game; in this format, the contestants themselves vote to evict each other. Big Brother Canada, introduced in 2013, also follows the American format.  In 2011, the UK version controversially adapted the discussion of nominations before reversing this rule after a poll by Big Brother broadcaster Channel 5.

With the cancellation of the UK edition in 2018 and the 2020 rebooted Australian series using an American-styled format, Big Brother Naija (Nigeria) is the only English-speaking edition in the franchise that follows the original international format with public voted evictions.

Reception

Overview 
From a sociological and demographic perspective, Big Brother allows an analysis of how people react when forced into close confinement with people outside of their comfort zone (having different opinions or ideals, or from a different socioeconomic group). The viewer has the opportunity to see how a person reacts from the outside (through the constant recording of their actions) and the inside (in the Diary or Confession Room). The Diary Room is where contestants can privately express their feelings about the game, strategy and the other contestants. The results range from violent or angry confrontations to genuine and tender connections (often including romantic interludes).

The show is notable for involving the Internet. Although the show typically broadcasts daily updates during the evening (sometimes criticized by viewers and former contestants for heavy editing by producers), viewers can also watch a continuous feed from multiple cameras on the Web in most countries. These websites were successful, even after some national series began charging for access to the video stream. In some countries, Internet broadcasting was supplemented by updates via email, WAP and SMS. The house is shown live on satellite television, although in some countries there is a 10–15 minutes delay to allow libelous or unacceptable content (such as references to people not participating in the program who have not consented to have personal information broadcast) to be removed.

Contestants occasionally develop sexual relationships; the level of sexual explicitness allowed to be shown in broadcast and Internet-feed varies according to the country's broadcasting standards.

Isolation 
Big Brother contestants are isolated in the house, without access to television, radio, or the Internet. They are not permitted routine communication with the outside world. This was an important issue for most earlier series of the show. In more-recent series, contestants are occasionally allowed to view televised events (usually as a reward for winning at a task). In most versions of the program, books and writing materials are also forbidden, although exceptions are sometimes made for religious materials such as the Bible, Tanakh or the Qur'an. Some versions ban all writing implements, even items that can be used to write (such as lipstick or eyeliner). Despite the housemates' isolation, some contestants are occasionally allowed to leave the house as part of tasks. Contestants are permitted to leave the house in an emergency.

News from the outside world may occasionally be given as a reward. Additionally, news of extraordinary events from the outside world may be given to the Housemates if such information is considered important, such notable past examples include that of national election results, (and occasionally participate in said elections) the September 11 attacks, and the COVID-19 pandemic.

Contestants have regularly-scheduled interactions with the show's host on eviction nights. Throughout each day, the program's producer, in the "Big Brother" voice, issues directives and commands to contestants. Some versions of the show allow private counselling sessions with a psychologist. These are allowed at any time and are often conducted by telephone from the Diary Room.

Format changes and twists

Regional versions 

Due to the intelligibility of certain languages across several nations, it has been possible to make regional versions of Big Brother. All of these follow the normal Big Brother rules, except that contestants must come from each of the countries in the region where it airs: Big Brother Albania of Albania and Kosovo, Big Brother Angola e Moçambique of Angola and Mozambique, Big Brother Africa of Africa (includes Angola, Botswana, Ethiopia, Ghana, Kenya, Liberia, Malawi, Mozambique, Namibia, Nigeria, Rwanda, Sierra Leone, South Africa, Tanzania, Uganda, Zambia and Zimbabwe), Big Brother: الرئيس of the Middle East (includes Bahrain, Egypt, Iraq, Jordan, Kuwait, Lebanon, Oman, Saudi Arabia, Somalia, Syria and Tunisia), Gran Hermano del Pacífico of South America (includes Chile, Ecuador and Peru), Big Brother of Scandinavia (includes Norway and Sweden) and Veliki brat of the Balkans (includes Serbia, Montenegro, Croatia, Bosnia and Herzegovina and North Macedonia). The British version of the show previously accepted Irish applicants, however the terms and conditions of ITV2's reboot state you must reside in the UK.

On the other hand, some countries have multiple franchises based on language. Bigg Boss of India has the most regional-based versions Hindi, Marathi, Tamil, Bengali, Telugu, Kannada and Malayalam language versions; Canada has French- and English-language versions; and the United States has English- and Spanish-language versions of the show.

Twists involving single franchises

Multiple areas and houses 
In 2001, Big Brother 3 of the Netherlands introduced the "Rich and Poor" concept, wherein the house is separated into a luxurious half and a poor half and two teams of housemates compete for a place in the luxurious half. The Dutch version continued this concept until its fourth season. Other versions later followed and introduced a similar concept, of which some have their own twists: Africa (in 2010, 2011, 2012 and 2013), Albania (in 2007), Australia (in 2003 and 2013), Balkan States (in VIP 2010 and 2011), Brazil (2009–present), Canada (2013–present), Denmark (in 2003), Finland (in 2009 and 2014), France (in 2009, 2011–2017), Germany (in 2003, 2004–05, 2005–06, 2008, 2008–09 and since Celebrity 2014), Greece (in 2003), India (in 2012 and 2013), Israel (in 2009), Italy (in 2006 and 2007), Norway (in 2003), Philippines (in 2009, Teen 2010 and 2011), Poland (in 2002), Portugal (in VIP 2013 and 2016), Slovakia (in 2005), Slovenia (in 2008, 2015 and 2016), Scandinavia (in 2005), South Africa (in 2014), Spain (in VIP 2004, 2008, 2009–10 and 2010), United Kingdom (in 2002, Celebrity 2007, 2008, Celebrity 2013 and 2016) and United States (2009–present).

In 2011–12, the seventh Argentine series added La Casa de al Lado ("The House Next Door"), a smaller, more luxurious house which served multiple functions. The first week it hosted 4 potential housemates, and the public voted for two of them to enter the main house. The second week, two pairs of twins competed in the same fashion, with only one pair allowed in. Later, the 3rd, 4th and 5th evicted contestants were given the choice of staying on their way out and they competed for the public's vote to reenter the house. Months later, after one of the contestants left the house voluntarily, the House Next Door reopened for four contestants who wanted to reenter and had not been in such a playoff before. The House Next Door was also used in other occasions to accommodate contestants from the main house for limited periods of time, especially to have more privacy (which of course could be seen by the public).

The ninth Brazilian season featured the "Bubble": a glass house in a shopping mall in Rio de Janeiro where four potential housemates lived for a week. Later in the season, a bubble was built inside the Big Brother house, with another two housemates living in it for a week until they were voted in and the glass house dismantled. The Glass House was reused in the eleventh season, featuring five evicted housemates competing for a chance to join the house again, and in the thirteenth season, with six potential housemates competing for two places in the main house. A dividing wall from the ninth season was reused in the fourteenth Brazilian season, when mothers and aunts of the housemates entered for International Women's Day and stayed in the house for 6 days, though they could not be seen by the housemates. Every season brings back the glass house. Some editions also featured an all-white panic room, where contestants were held until one of them decided to quit the show.

In the fourth English-Canadian season, two house guests were evicted and moved into a special suite where they were able to watch the remaining house guests. A week later, the houseguests were required to unanimously decide which of them to bring back into the house.

Evil Big Brother 
In 2004, the fifth UK series introduced a villainous Big Brother with harsher punishments, such as taking away prize money, more difficult tasks and secret tricks. This concept has also been used in Australia, Belgium, Bulgaria, Croatia, Finland, Germany, Greece, Italy, the Netherlands, South America, Scandinavia, Serbia, Spain, Thailand, Philippines and Mexico.

Twin or triplet housemates 
In 2004, the fifth US season introduced twins who were tasked with secretly switching back and forth in the house; they were allowed to play the game as individual house guests after succeeding at the deception for four weeks. This twist was reused in the seventeenth US season without the deception element – the pair simply needed to survive five weeks without being evicted. HouseGuests who discovered this twist could use the twins to their strategic advantage.

This twin or triplet twist was used in several countries. Some made modifications to this twist; others have had twins in the house together without this element of secrecy. The following are the countries that have featured twins or triplets: Australia (in 2005), Germany (in 2005–06), Brazil (in 2006 and 2015), Bulgaria (in 2006, 2012 and VIP 2017), United Kingdom (in 2007, Celebrity 2011, Celebrity 2012, 2013, 2015, 2016 and Celebrity 2017), France (in 2007, 2011, 2013, 2015 and 2016), Spain (in 2007 and 2013), Poland (in 2007 and 2019), India (in 2008), Africa (in 2009), Balkan Region (in 2009 and 2013), Philippines (in 2009, Teen 2012 and 2014), Portugal (in 2010 and 2012), Israel (in 2011), Ukraine (in 2011), Argentina (in 2011 and 2016), Albania (in 2013, 2017, Celebrity 2021-22 and Celebrity 2022-23), Greece (in 2020) and Kosovo (in Celebrity 2022-23).

Pairs competitions 
Several versions of the program feature variations of the housemates competing in pairs:

 In sixth American season, each HouseGuest had a secret partner with whom had a pre-existing relationship. While each player was nominated and evicted as an individual, each pair had the goal of reaching being the Final 2 HouseGuests remaining. Should a secret pair succeed in this goal, the prize money awarded to the winner and runner-up would jackpot – the winner's prize doubling from $500,000 to $1,000,000 and the runner-up's prize quintupling from $50,000 to $250,000. 
 During the tenth week of the seventh UK series, the housemates were paired with their "best friend" in the house and had to nominate and face eviction as couples. 
 The ninth American season added a romantic theme by pairing up the HouseGuests with their "Soulmate" and having them compete as couples. This twist was active for the first 3 weeks of the season. 
 The 13th American season featured a further twist to the pairs format by introducing the "Dynamic Duos" twist, where contestants formed pairs that would be nominated together but evicted separately. The nominee not evicted would be immune from further nomination until there were 10 HouseGuests remaining, at which point the pairs were dissolved.
  The second season of the Philippine teen edition also featured the parents or guardians of the teens staying in the house; if a teen housemate was evicted, the coinciding parent or guardian would also be evicted.  A similar twist was used on the fourth Greek season was dubbed "Big Mother", and featured housemates accompanied by their mothers.
 In the ninth season of Indian Big Brother, "Big Boss: Double Trouble", contestants entered the house tied up in pairs by the waist. They had joint chairs, beds, spoons, and even mugs. The twelfth season of Indian Big Brother "Bigg Boss 12" also featured jodis (pairs) who were Teacher-Student, Policeman-Lawyer, sister-sister, etc.
 In the ninth Albania season, all the housemates wherever were in couples and for the first time in the history of Big Brother Albania, the winner was a couple (Danjel Dedndreaj and Fotini Derxho).

Secret missions 

Secret missions are a common element of the show since their introduction during the sixth UK series. During these missions, one or more housemates are set a task from Big Brother with the reward of luxuries for the household and/or a personal reward if the task is successful. Some versions of Big Brother have secret tasks presented by another character who lives in plain sight of the housemate. Such characters include Marsha the Moose (from BB Canada) and Surly the Fish (from BB Australia).

The third Belgian season introduced a mole. This housemate was given secret missions by Big Brother.

The eighth US season introduced "America's Player", where a selected house guest must complete various tasks (determined by public vote) in secret for the duration of their stay in the house in exchange for a cash reward. It was repeated in the tenth US season for a week. The eleventh US season featured Pandora's Box, in which the winning head of household was tempted to open a box, with unintended consequences for the house. The twelfth US season featured a saboteur, who entered the house to wreak havoc with tasks suggested by viewers. The sixteenth US season featured "Team America", in which 3 houseguests were selected to work as a team to complete tasks (determined by public voting) for a cash reward; this continued for the entire season despite the eviction of a team member.

The fourth Argentine series added a telephone in the living room. This telephone rang once a week for ten seconds, and the person to pick up the receiver was given an order or news from Big Brother (which typically no other housemate could hear). The order could be beneficial or detrimental, but a refused order resulted in the nomination for eviction. If nobody picked up the call, the whole house would be nominated for eviction.

Opening night twists 
Since Big Brother 2, the UK series has opened with a twist. This has included having potential Housemates being voted upon by the public for one to enter the house (Big Brother 2 & Big Brother 13); public voting for least-favourite housemates, with the housemates choosing between two nominees to evict (Big Brother 3); first-night nominations (Big Brother 4 & Big Brother 13); suitcase nominations (Big Brother 5); Unlucky Housemate 13 (Big Brother 6); Big Brother Hood (Big Brother 7); an all-female house and a set of twins as contestants (Big Brother 8); a couple entering as housemates, who must hide their relationship (Big Brother 9); housemates having to earn housemate status (Big Brother 10); a mole entering the house with an impossible task (Big Brother 11); Pamela Anderson entering as a guest for 5 days (Big Brother 12); a professional actor posing as a housemate and a mother and daughter as contestants (Big Brother 14); one contestant gets a pass to the final (Big Brother 15); first night eviction (Big Brother 16); two houses with "the other house" featuring enemies from the main house housemates past (Big Brother 17); Jackie Stallone entering a house containing her son's ex-wife Brigitte Nielsen (Celebrity Big Brother 3); a "fake celebrity" (a civilian contestant pretending to be a celebrity) in a celebrity edition (Celebrity Big Brother 4); a visit from Jade Goody's family (Celebrity Big Brother 5) and unlocked bedrooms allowing housemates to immediately claim beds with the last housemate becoming the Head of House (Celebrity Big Brother 6).

A common opening twist is to only introduce a cast of a single-sex on the premiere of the show while having members of the opposite sex introduced over the next few days. The eighth UK series first used this twist with an initial all-female house, adding a male housemate two days later. The same twist was used in the fourth Bulgarian series, and an all-male premiere was used on Big Brother Africa 4. The second Belgian season was used a similar twist in 2001, where eleven male housemates and one female housemate entered the house on launch night and the second female housemate entered the house on the third day.

Fake evictions 

The fifth UK series introduced fake evictions, where Big Brother misleads housemates that eviction has taken place, only for the "evicted" housemate to reenter the house sometime later.

In the eighth UK series, one housemate was evicted, interviewed and sent back into the house.

In the fifth Philippine season, four housemates were fake-evicted and stayed in a place called bodega. In the second batch of the eight Philippine season, four housemates were fake-evicted due to losing their duel challenge and temporarily stayed in a secret room. In the adult edition of the tenth Philippine season, two housemates, and later three more, were fake-evicted after failing in two different Ligtask challenges and temporarily stayed in the task room until the end of their weekly task.

The concept of the fake-eviction was incorporated into the Australian series for the first time in the sixth Australian season, where housemates Camilla Severi and Anna Lind-Hansen were both fake-evicted in Day 8, and were moved into a secret room in the house, the Revenge Room. Severi and Lind-Hansen could see who nominated them for eviction and were given the opportunity to wreak havoc upon the house and those who nominated them by constructing extravagant tasks for the housemates to complete and for making mess in the house when they were not looking. Severi and Lind-Hansen returned to the house in a live special on Day 10. In the tenth Australian season, Benjamin Zabel was fake-evicted for 24 hours before being returned to the house with immunity from eviction for that week. In the eleventh Australian season Travis Lunardi was fake-evicted and received advice from Benjamin Zabel for 24 hours; Travis returned to the house after a 3-day absence with immunity from eviction for that week.

In the thirteenth Brazilian series, Anamara Barreira was fake-evicted. She was removed and put into a small private apartment without the other housemates knowing she was still in the house. After 24 hours, she returned to the house as Head of Household and with immunity from eviction that week. In the sixteenth Brazilian series, Ana Paula Renault was similarly fake-evicted, put into a small private apartment, and returned after 48 hours with immunity from eviction that week. In the eighteen Brazilian series, Gleici Damasceno was similarly fake-evicted, put into a small private apartment, and returned after 72 hours with immunity from eviction and with the power to put someone to eviction.

In the first Turkish series, there is a fake eviction in week 10.

The Indian version Bigg Boss sees frequent fake evictions. In Kannada Bigg Boss season 4, winner Pratham and co-contestant Malavika were kept in secret room after fake eviction for one week and they were both allowed in the Bigg Boss house.

Similarly in Kannada Bigg Boss season 5, firstly Jaya Srinivasan and Sameer Acharya were put into the secret room after fake eviction for one week and then Sameer Acharya was allowed into the house but Jaya Srinivasan was evicted from the secret room itself. In the same season, the runner up Divakar was put into the secret room after fake eviction for one week.

Coaches 
The fourteenth US season had four house guests from past seasons return to coach twelve new house guests, playing for a separate prize of $100,000. However, in a reset twist, they opted to join the normal game alongside the other house guests.

Red button 
The seventh Argentine series incorporated a red button into the Confession Room, which would sound an alarm throughout the house. This button was to be used when a contestant wanted to leave the house voluntarily, and the contestant would be given five minutes to leave the house. A red button is also used in Secret Story series, however, in this case whoever presses the button will try to guess someone's secret.

Legacy rewards or penalties 
In Celebrity Hijack UK, evicted housemates were given the opportunity to choose if a "ninja" delivered good or bad gifts to the house. Later that year, the eighth Australian series introduced the Housemate Hand Grenade, where an evicted housemate decided which remaining housemate received a penalty. A similar punishment used on Big Brother Africa was called the Molotov Cocktail, Dagger or Fuse.

Most valuable player 
The fifteenth US season allowed viewers to vote for a house guest to be made M.V.P., who then secretly nominates a third houseguest for eviction (in addition to the two selected by the Head of Household).

In a further twist introduced part-way through the MVP twist, the viewers themselves decided who the third nominee would be, with the HouseGuests still thinking one of their own is the MVP. Like many such twists, this was ended halfway into the season as the pool of contestants shrank.

Multiple heads of household 
The sixteenth and seventeenth US seasons featured two Heads of Household every week and had four houseguests nominated for eviction. There was also a "Battle of the Block" competition where the two sets of nominees competed to save themselves; the winning pair not only saved themselves but dethroned the Head of Household who nominated them, who was then vulnerable as a replacement nominee if a veto was used. It is also used in specific weeks in Brazil since Big Brother Brasil 16 where the HOH's have to choose which HoH will get R$10,000 and who is the one that will win immunity.

America's Favorite HouseGuest 
In the US version, each season there are three cash prizes: $750,000 for the winner, $75,000 for second, and $50,000 for who was voted by the viewers to be America's Favorite HouseGuest.

Multiple winners 
In 2011, Big Brother Africa (season 6) was the first season of Big Brother to have two winners, each getting US$200,000.

In 2015, the sixth Philippine season, also had two winners; one from the teens and one from the regular adults. Each of which received PHP1,000,000.

Bigg Boss 8 (India) ended with a twist, where the top five contestants were crowned 'champions'. The season was extended by 35 days (total 135) as a spin-off called Bigg Boss Halla Bol, where ex-contestants from previous seasons entered the house to compete with the five champions.

Reserve housemates 
The fourth Philippine season introduced the concept of having reserved housemates, those of whom are short-listed auditioners who were given a chance to be a housemate by completing tasks assigned by Big Brother. It was eventually done also in the eighth Philippine season where the reserved housemates were placed in a camp (a separate House but is just adjacent to the Main House) and that reserved housemate must compete amongst other reserved housemates while gaining points by participating in various tasks, including those that required the participation of doing such tasks outside of the Big Brother House premises.

This reserved housemates twist was also used in Argentina's seventh season and Brazil's ninth season.

Big Brother Zoom 

In 2020, due to the COVID-19 pandemic, the Big Brother Portugal revival started with a twist, where all the contestants were isolated in different apartments for 14 days, in line with World Health Organisation (WHO) recommendations. Cameras were filming them 24 hours a day as usual, and they were able to communicate with each other and host Cláudio Ramos using tablets.

Twists involving multiple franchises

Housemate exchanges 
In 2002, the Mexican and Spanish editions (BBM1 and GH3) made temporary housemate exchanges. Mexico's Eduardo Orozco swapped with Spain's Andrés Barreiro for 7 days. In 2010, the first 2-housemate exchange was held by Spain and Italy (GH11 and GF10). Gerardo Prager and Saray Pereira from Spain were swapped with Carmela Gualtieri and Massimo Scattarella of Italy for 7 days.

In later years, several housemate exchanges were done around the world: Argentina (GH3) and Spain (GH4), Ecuador (GH1) and Mexico (BBM2), and Africa (BBA1) and United Kingdom (BB4) in 2003; Scandinavia (BB2) and Thailand (BBT2) in 2006; Philippines (PBB2) and Slovenia (BB1), and Argentina (GH5) and Spain (GH9) in 2007; Africa (BBA3) and Finland (BB4) in 2008; Finland (BB5) and Philippines (PBB3) in 2009; Finland (BB6) and Slovenia (BBS1) in 2010; Spain (GH12) and Israel (HH3) in 2010–11; Finland (BB7) and Norway (BB4) in 2011; Argentina (GH7) and Israel (HH4) in 2012; Mexico (BB4) and Spain (GH16) in 2015; and Spain (GHVIP5) and Brazil (BBB17) in 2017.

Evicted housemate exchanges 
In 2003, Mexico's Isabel Madow (BB VIP2) and Spain's Aída Nízar (GH5) were swapped for 7 days. This twist was also done between Russia (BBR1) and Pacific (GHP1) in 2005, and Argentina (GH4) and Brazil (BBB7) in 2007.

Other exchanges 
In 2009, as part of the casting process for Italy's GF9, Doroti Polito and Leonia Coccia visited Spain's GH10.

In 2012, four contestants from Denmark's BB4 visited Sweden's BB6 and competed in a Viking-themed challenge. The Danish team won and 'kidnapped' Swedish contestant Annica Englund to the Denmark house for the following week.

In 2012, evicted housemate Laisa Portella of Brazil (from BBB12) was a guest on Spain's Gran Hermano 13 for a week; the following week, non-evicted Noemí Merino of GH13 stayed in the Brazilian Big Brother house for 5 days.

In 2016, Big Brother UK housemate Nikki Grahame and Big Brother Australia housemate Tim Dormer were voted in by Canada to be houseguests on the 4th season of Big Brother Canada. Similarly, Big Brother UK housemate Jade Goody appeared as a housemate on Bigg Boss India.

Big Brother Australia (2015) contestant Priya Malik joined Bigg Boss 9 (India) the same year as a wild card.

In 2017, GHVIP5 contestant Elettra Lamborghini visited Brazil's BBB17.

In 2019, the winner of Italy's GF15, Alberto Mezzetti visited Brazil's BBB19.

After winning the debut season of Bigg Boss Marathi (regional version of Big Brother), winner Megha Dhade made her entry in Bigg Boss season 12 as a wild card contestant.

Evicted housemate visits 
Anouska Golebiewski, an evicted housemate from the United Kingdom (housemate from BB4) visited Australia (BB3) in 2003. In 2005, United Kingdom (Nadia Almada of BB5) visited Australia (BB5) again. In 2006, United Kingdom (Chantelle Houghton of CBB4) visited Germany (BBG6). This twist was used in later years by other countries: Africa (Ricardo Ferreira of BBA3) visited Brazil (BBB9) in 2009; Germany (Annina Ucatis and Sascha Schwan of BBG9) visited the Philippines (PBB3), and Italy (George Leonard and Veronica Ciardi of GF10) visited Albania (BB3) in 2010; Sweden (Martin Granetoft and Peter OrrmyrSara Jonsson of BB5) visited Norway (BB4) in 2011; Brazil (Rafael Cordeiro of BBB12) visited Spain (GH12), and Argentina (Agustín Belforte of GH4) visited Colombia (GH2) in 2012; United States (Dan Gheesling of BB10/BB14) visited Canada (BB1 and the BB2 Jury) in 2013; Canada (Emmett Blois of BB1) visited South Africa (BBM3) in 2014; and Spain (Paula Gonzalez of GH 15) visited Mexico (BBM4) in 2015.

A similar event took place between the United States and Canada in 2014 wherein Rachel Reilly (from BB12/BB13) made a video chat to Canada (BB2). Rachel Reilly also appeared on Big Brother Canadas side show, which airs after the eviction episode.

Housemates competing in another country 
There were occasions that a former housemate from one franchise participated and competed in a different franchise: Daniela Martins of France (SS3) competed in Portugal (SS1); Daniel Mkongo of France (SS5) competed in Italy (GF12); Brigitte Nielsen of Denmark (BB VIP) competed in the United Kingdom (CBB3); Jade Goody of the United Kingdom (BB3, BB Panto, and CBB5) competed in India (BB2); Sava Radović of Germany (BB4) competed in the Balkan States (VB1); Nikola Nasteski of the Balkan States (VB4) competed in Bulgaria (BB All-Stars 1); Žarko Stojanović of France (SS5) competed in the Balkan States (VB VIP5); Željko Stojanović of France (SS5) competed in the Balkan States (VB VIP5); Kelly Baron of Brazil (BBB13) competed in Portugal (BB VIP); Lucy Diakovska of Bulgaria (VIP B4) competed in Germany (PBB1); Leila Ben Khalifa of Italy (GF6) competed in France (SS8); Priya Malik of Australia (BB11) competed in India (BB9); Tim Dormer of Australia (BB10) and Nikki Grahame of the United Kingdom (BB7, UBB) competed in Canada (BB4) after beating Jase Wirey of the United States (BB5, BB7) and Veronica Graf of Italy (GF13) in a public vote; Leonel Estevao-Luto of Africa (BB4) competed in Angola & Mozambique (BB3); Frankie Grande of the United States (BB16) competed in the United Kingdom (CBB18); Fanny Rodrigues of Portugal (SS2) competed in France (SS10); and Tucha Anita of Angola (BB3); Amor Romeira of Spain (GH9) competed in Portugal (SS6) and Alain Rochette of Spain (GH17) competed in France (SS11); Despite being American, Brandi Glanville competed first in the United Kingdom (CBB20) then later competed in first Celebrity series in the United States (CBB1); Aída Nizar of Spain (GH5 and GHVIP5) competed in Italy (GF15); Ivana Icardi of Argentina (GH9) competed in Italy (GF16); Gianmarco Onestini of Italy (GF16) competed in Spain (GHVIP7).

Multiple-franchise competitions

Eurovision Song Contest

FIFA World Cup

Special editions

Celebrity and VIP Big Brother 

The Big Brother format has been adopted in some countries; the housemates are local celebrities, and the shows are called Celebrity Big Brother or Big Brother VIP. In some countries, the prize money normally awarded to the winning housemate is donated to a charity, and all celebrities are paid to appear in the show as long as they do not voluntarily leave before their eviction or the end of the series. The rest of the rules are nearly the same as those of the original version.

Variations 
The 2006 Netherlands series was entitled Hotel Big Brother. This variation introduced a group of celebrity hoteliers and a Big Boss, who run a hotel and collect money for charity without nominations, evictions or a winner.

Another variation appeared in the UK in early 2008, entitled Big Brother: Celebrity Hijack. Instead of being housemates the celebrities became Big Brother himself, creating tasks and holding nominations with the help of Big Brother. The housemates were considered by the producers "Britain's most exceptional and extraordinary" 18- to 21-year-olds. The prize for the winner of the series was £50,000.

In 2009, VIP Brother 3 Bulgaria introduced the concept of celebrities competing for charitable causes, which changed each week. Housemates were sometimes allowed to leave the house to raise money for the charity. Ten out of Thirteen seasons of Bigg Boss (the Indian version of Big Brother) have been celebrity-only seasons. The 10th season of Big Boss had celebrities put up against commoners, where a commoner ultimately won.

American format 
 
The US and Canadian versions of Big Brother differ from most global versions of the series. The US series began in 2000 with the original Dutch format—i.e., housemates, or HouseGuests, as they are styled in the US, nominating each other for eviction and the public voting on evictions and the eventual winner. But due to both poor ratings and the concurrent popularity of Survivor, a gameplay-oriented format was introduced in the second season, with HouseGuests allowed to strategize, politic and collude to survive eviction, with the entire nomination and eviction process being determined by the HouseGuest themselves.

Each week the HouseGuests compete in several competitions in order to win power and safety inside the house, before voting off one of the HouseGuests during the eviction. The main elements of the format are as follows:
Head of Household (HoH): At the start of each week in the house, the HouseGuests compete for the title of Head of Household, often shortened to simply HoH. The Head of Household for each week is given luxuries such as their own personal bedroom and the use of an MP3 player, but is responsible for nominating two of their fellow HouseGuests for eviction. The Head of Household would not be able to compete in the following week's Head of Household competition; this excludes the final Head of Household competition of the season.
Power of Veto (PoV):  After the nominees are determined, the Power of Veto competition is played, with the winner receiving the Power of Veto. If a HouseGuest chooses to exercise the Power of Veto, the Head of Household is responsible for naming a replacement nominee. The holder of the Power of Veto is saved from being nominated as the replacement nominee. Only six of the HouseGuests compete for the Power of Veto each week; the Head of Household and both nominations compete, as well as three others selected by a random draw. The PoV was introduced in the third American season
Eviction: On eviction night, all HouseGuests must vote to evict one of the nominees, with the exception of the nominees and the Head of Household. The eviction vote is by secret ballot, with HouseGuests casting their votes orally in the Diary Room. In the event of a tied vote, the Head of Household will cast a tie-breaking vote publicly. The nominee with the majority of the votes is evicted from the house.

Before the sixteenth US season, HouseGuests competed in a Have/Have-Not challenge similar to the shopping tasks on Big Brother UK and other international editions. The winners become Haves and enjoy a full pantry of food, while Have-Nots, will be left with a staple diet of "slop" (fortified oatmeal), sleep in designated uncomfortable beds and take cold showers. In later seasons, the Haves & Have-Nots are determined either by the HoH themself or by the results of the HoH Competition.

When only two contestants remain, a jury formed of the most recently evicted HouseGuests (generally seven or nine) votes which of the two finalists wins the grand prize. Beginning in the fourth (2003) US season, jury members were sequestered off-site so that they would not be privy to the day-to-day goings-on in the house. (Celebrity Big Brother US does not sequester its jury members—all evicted celebrity HouseGuests vote on the winner.). The final Head of Household competition is split into three parts; the winners of the first two rounds compete in the third and final round. Once only two HouseGuests remain, the members of the jury cast their votes for who should win the series.

In addition, US and Canadian Big Brother do not air a live launch show, as is customary in international editions—by the time the network show and live online feeds begin airing, it is not uncommon for at least one HouseGuest to already have been evicted. Also, the North American editions currently air only three times a week, compared with daily or six days a week for the recently cancelled UK franchise. As a result, the TV episodes focus primarily on the main events regarding the gameplay and house politics versus the day-to-day goings-on in the house; to see the latter, watching the live feeds is necessary.

In 2013, English-speaking Canada introduced its own version of the show on the cable channel Slice; the series moved to Global TV for its third (2015) season. The show followed the US format, but with more elaborate twists and greater viewer participation in the game. Secret tasks were introduced, usually presented by the show's mascot, "Marsha the Moose"; also, as in most global franchises, Big Brother was a distinct character who interacted with the HouseGuests. The French Canadian version mostly followed the US/Anglophone Canadian format, but the public could evict a housemate on some occasions and decided the winner.

The 2020 revival of the Big Brother Australia series adopted a slightly altered version of the American format (having previously used the international format) while pre-recording the series months in advance. A "Nomination Challenge" is held to determine who holds the power to nominate for that round, with the winner naming three Nominations for Eviction. During each eviction, all Housemates (excluding the Nominating Housemate) vote to evict. There is no rule prohibiting individuals holding Nomination Power in consecutively between weeks and no Power of Veto is held. Additionally, the Australian public still decided the winner between the final 3.

Big Brother Brasil combines the US/Canada and international formats. Brazil votes on evictions and the winner, but housemates compete for HoH, Power of Immunity, and Power of Veto; there is also a weekly shopping competition. HoH nominates one housemate for eviction, while the rest of the house nominates a second housemate. The winner of the Power of Immunity competition gets to choose someone to be safe from nomination.

The pilot for Big Brother China, which premiered exclusively online in 2015, had housemates voting on evictions but the public voting for the winner. A similar format was used for Big Brother: Over the Top, an online-only spin-off of the US series that ran in 2016.

The nineteenth series of Big Brother UK saw the adaption of the "Game Changer" competition which is very similar to the Power of Veto competition. The winner of this competition has the opportunity to save a nominee from eviction. Like the PoV, there are six people that play in the "Game Changer" competition. The process of how the contestants are chosen is different as the people who have been nominated play in the competition along with the richest housemate. If there are empty left in the competition, then the richest housemate hand picks who will playing in that weeks "Game Changer" competition. The winner of the competition, like the PoV, has the option to save housemate from eviction for the week or not use the power at all. Unlike the PoV however, if the winner does save someone then no replacement nominee was named leaving the remaining nominees up for eviction and facing the public vote.

Other editions 
The Big Brother format has been otherwise modified in some countries:
 Big Brother: All-Stars (Belgium, 21 days; Bulgaria: Season 1–5, 27–29 days; United States, 72 days; United Kingdom, 18 days; French Canada, 64 days; Africa, 91 days; Spain, 56 days; Portugal Secret Story: Season 1–4, 22–50 days): Previous housemates from previous seasons compete. Belgium was the first country to have an All-Stars season (2003). Bulgaria was the first country to complete 3 All-Stars seasons (2014). Portugal was the first country to complete 4 All-Stars seasons (2015). Portugal was the first country to complete 5 All-Stars seasons (2017). Portugal was the first country to complete 6 All-Stars seasons (2018).
 Big Brother: Reality All-Stars (Sweden, 6 days; Denmark, 32 days; Spain, 56 days): Contestants from different reality shows, including Big Brother, compete.
 Big Brother: You Decide / Big Brother: Back in the House / Big Brother: Try Out (Poland: Season 1–2, 7–13 days; Norway, 9 days; Serbia, 7 days): Housemates, new or old, compete for a spot in the next regular season without nominations or evictions.
 Teen Big Brother (United Kingdom, 10 days; Philippines: Season 1–4, 42–91 days): Teenagers 13 and older compete.
 Big Brother: All In (Philippines: Season 11,13): A mix of teenagers, regular adults, and celebrities compete in one season. A variation, Big Brother: Lucky 7 and Big Brother: Otso, has three to four batch of housemates stay inside until a number for each batch is left, and is joined by other members of other batches to form one new batch.
 Secret Story (France, Lithuania, Portugal, Netherlands, Peru, Albania and Spain): Each housemate has a secret.
 Big Brother Panto (United Kingdom, 11 days): Housemates from the previous series spent time in the Big Brother House to perform a pantomime at the series' end.
 Big Brother – The Village (Germany: Season 6, 363 days): The village had a class system of bosses, assistants and servants, living in separate houses, who competed in mixed teams; winning bosses could promote employees, while losing bosses became servants. Cash prizes were awarded weekly in an ongoing contest.
 Big Brother Family (Bulgaria: 81 days): Whole families entered the house with their spouses, children and relatives. They received a salary for their stay and the winning family received a cash prize, a car and an apartment.

There are also "test runs", with a group of celebrities (or journalists) living in the house for several days to test it. There are occasions where people who have auditioned for the show are also put in the house, most notably in the British edition, where many housemates claim to have met before. These series have been televised in Argentina, Bulgaria, Czech Republic, Germany, Mexico, the Pacific region, the Philippines and Spain. In some cases, it is not broadcast, but in others, such as the US edition, it is used as a promotional tool.

Versions 

: Currently airing (11)
 An upcoming season (6)
 Status unknown (8)
 No longer airing (37)

Big Brother: The Game
On 5 May 2020, Endemol Shine Group announced that an official Big Brother mobile game named "Big Brother: The Game" developed by an Irish gaming company 9th Impact and will be available worldwide later this year. In the game, players will use strategies, vote, and evict their fellow players out of the game. The winner of the first season got the chance to win a $1,000,000 prize.

A trial season took place in the Republic of Ireland during the summer of 2020. The player Aoife Cheung won a €5000 prize after surviving four evictions. The game was officially launched on 15 October 2020 worldwide for both iOS, Android devices and PC platform.

The first season concluded on 29 July 2021, and was won by the player, Amy Elizabeth, a 31-year-old special education teacher from Delaware who won a grand prize of $33,270.

Controversies

Legal 
In April 2000, Castaway, an independent production company, filed a lawsuit against John de Mol and Endemol for stealing the concepts of their own show called Survive!, a reality television show where contestants are placed on a deserted island and have to take care of themselves alone. These contestants were also filmed by cameras around them. The court later dismissed the lawsuit filed by Castaway against de Mol and Endemol. The Survive! reality television format was later turned into Survivor.

In 2000, the estate of George Orwell sued CBS Television and Endemol for copyright and trademark infringement, claiming that the program infringed on the Orwell novel 1984 and its trademarks. After a series of court rulings adverse to the defendants (CBS and Endemol), the case was settled for an undisclosed amount of money on the evening of the trial.

Sexual assault 
There have been three documented occurrences of possible rape happening during the show. In Big Brother South Africa, a male housemate was accused of assaulting a fellow housemate while she was asleep. The pair were filmed kissing and cuddling in bed before the cameras moved away and the male housemate reportedly claimed to housemates the next day that he had intercourse with the contestant. However, the female housemate was apparently shocked by the claims and informed female housemates that she had not consented to have sex with him (under South African law, this act would be constituted as rape). This male housemate was expelled immediately after the allegations surfaced, and was later arrested pending investigation, while the female housemate was removed from the house for her own protection and counselling. After this incident, the other housemates were warned not to attempt any further obscene actions, or they would be subject to a penalty of 43 years in prison and immediate expulsion from the house.

In Big Brother Brasil, many viewers reported that they watched a male housemate allegedly force himself on a female housemate while she was passed-out drunk after a "boozy party". Soon after, the Polícia Federal entered the house and arrested the offending housemate, who was later banned from ever appearing on the show again.

Additionally, an incident of sexual assault occurred in the Australian Big Brother house in 2006, during the show's sixth season. Contestant Michael "John" Bric held down fellow contestant Camilla Severi in her bed while a second man, Michael "Ashley" Cox, "slapped" her in the face with his penis, an indecent act illegal under Australian law. The incident was shown on the 'Adults-only' late-night segment, Big Brother: Adults Only, leading to the show's cancellation. Both men involved in the incident were removed from the house and arrested pending trial.

References

Bibliography

External links 

 
Banijay franchises
Reality television series franchises